Eragrostis leptostachya is a species of grass known as the paddock lovegrass. Found in eastern Australia, it may be seen growing in eucalyptus woodland or pasture. As Poa leptostachya, it was one of the many plants first published by Robert Brown with the type known as "(J.) v.v." Appearing in his Prodromus Florae Novae Hollandiae et Insulae Van Diemen in 1810.

References

leptostachya
Flora of New South Wales
Flora of Queensland
Flora of Victoria (Australia)
Poales of Australia